Kazimierz Boratyński (born July 30, 1906 in Gródek – December 8, 1991 in Wrocław) was a Polish chemist. He specialised in the field of soil science.

In his research work, he dealt with the chemistry of mineral fertilisers, soil chemistry and physics, humus processes in soil, and soil geography.

Publications
 O kwasach metafosforowych (1932)
 Metafosforany i pirofosforany jako źródło fosforu dla roślin (1933)
 O odmianach pięciotlenku fosforu (1933)
 Badania nad próchnicą (1962-1965)
 Wpływ nawożenia na związki próchnicze gleby lekkiej (1968)

Polish chemists
Polish soil scientists
1906 births
1991 deaths